Tiny Brauer (born Harold J. Brauer; June 26, 1909 – March 19, 1990) was an American film actor. Born in Brooklyn, New York, Brauer appeared in over 20 films between 1946 and 1966.

Career
Brauer is best known for his role as the "heavy" in several Three Stooges short subjects, particularly in Three Loan Wolves, Fright Night, and Sing a Song of Six Pants.

Though he made less than a dozen appearances with the slapstick comedy trio, he was one of only two supporting actors who appears on film with all four configurations of the Stooges (i.e. third Stooge played by Curly Howard, Shemp Howard, Joe Besser, and Curly Joe DeRita). Emil Sitka was the other supporting actor to achieve this goal.

Over the course of his 20-year career, Brauer was billed under several different names. In addition to his work with the Stooges, Brauer also worked with Jimmy Durante and Schilling  and Lane.

Death
Brauer was the guest of honor at the April 1989 Three Stooges convention held in Trevose, Pennsylvania. He died of natural causes just shy of a year later on March 19, 1990.

Selected filmography
 The Outlaws Is Coming (1965)
 Quiz Whizz (1958)
 Fling in the Ring (1955) (stock footage)
 Rip, Sew and Stitch (1953) (stock footage)
 Fuelin' Around (1949)
 Squareheads of the Round Table (1948)
 Fiddlers Three (1948)
 Sing a Song of Six Pants (1947)
 Fright Night (1947)
 Three Loan Wolves (1946)

External links

Harold "Tiny" Brauer at threestooges.net

1909 births
1990 deaths
American male film actors
People from Brooklyn
20th-century American male actors
20th-century American comedians